Sir William Jeffcott (1800 – 22 October 1855) was an Anglo-Irish barrister, a judge of the Supreme Court of New South Wales for the District of Port Phillip and Recorder of Prince of Wales Island, Malacca and Singapore.

Background
Born in Ireland, he obtained a bachelor of arts from Trinity College, Dublin and in 1828 he was called to the Irish Bar. In 1836 his brother John Jeffcott became the first judge of the Supreme Court of South Australia. In June 1843, Jeffcott migrated to the Colony of New South Wales.

Judge
On 24 June 1843 John Willis was notified that he had been amoved by Governor Gipps as the judge of the Supreme Court of New South Wales for the District of Port Phillip and Jeffcott was promptly appointed to replace him. In February 1844 Willis appealed to the Privy Council. Jeffcott was concerned that if Willis was found to have been invalidly removed then his own appointment may also have been invalid. Of particular concern was that if he imposed the death penalty then he may be guilty of murder. It has been doubted whether Jeffcott's concerns were well founded, given the long standing protection of de facto officers. Jeffoctt resigned in December 1844 and was replaced by Roger Therry.

Recorder
Jeffcott returned to practice at the Irish Bar. In 1850 he was appointed Recorder of Prince of Wales Island, Malacca and Singapore, to replace Sir Christopher Rawlinson who had been appointed Chief Justice of the Supreme Court of Judicature at Madras.

Jeffcott died from dysentery on 23 October 1855 and is buried in Penang.

See also
Judiciary of Australia
List of Judges of the Supreme Court of Victoria
List of Judges of the Supreme Court of New South Wales

References

 

1800 births
1855 deaths
Irish emigrants to colonial Australia
Knights Bachelor
Alumni of Trinity College Dublin
Colony of New South Wales judges
Judges of the Supreme Court of New South Wales
Straits Settlements judges
British colonial judges in Asia
19th-century Australian judges
Deaths from dysentery